John Court (21 January 1846 – 6 July 1933) was a New Zealand draper, businessman, city councillor and philanthropist. He was born in Bradley Green, Worcestershire, England on 21 January 1846.

References

1846 births
1933 deaths
Auckland City Councillors
Deputy mayors of places in New Zealand
New Zealand businesspeople
New Zealand philanthropists
English emigrants to New Zealand
New Zealand drapers